Palace is a British alternative rock and blues rock band from London. The band has released three full-length studio albums to date.

History
Palace formed as a 4 piece band on 15 September 2012 and comprised Leo Wyndham, Rupert Turner, Will Dorey, and Matt Hodges. They released their debut EP titled Lost in the Night. In 2015, Palace released their second EP titled Chase The Light. In 2016, Palace released their first full-length album titled So Long Forever.  Will Dorey left the band in 2017, now cultivating his new musical project called Skinshape. In 2019, the now newly 3 piece band released their second full-length album titled Life After. On 21 January 2022, Palace released their third full-length album titled Shoals.

Discography

Studio albums
 So Long Forever (2016)
 Life After (2019)
Shoals (2022)

EPs
 Lost in the Night (2014)
 Chase the Light (2015)
 Someday, Somewhere (2020)
 Gravity (2021)
 Lover (Don't Let Me Down) (2021)
 Fade (2021)
 Where Sky Becomes Sea (2021)
 Shame On You (2022)
Friends Forever (2022)

References

External links
 
 

English alternative rock groups
Musical groups established in 2014
Musical groups from London
2014 establishments in England